Emil Lie (29 July 1897 – 3 August 1976) was a Norwegian sculptor.

Lie was born in Berchtesgaden to novelist Bernt Lie and Hedvig Mariboe Aubert. He was married three times, and among his fathers-in-law were ship owner Lars Christensen and writer Helge Krog. His works include decorations of Rådhusplassen outside the in Oslo City Hall, and several portrait busts and sculptures. He chaired Norsk Billedhuggerforening from 1954 to 1957.

References

External links
 

1897 births
1976 deaths
People from Berchtesgaden
Norwegian sculptors